Matika Lorraine Wilbur is a member of the Swinomish and Tulalip tribes of the State of Washington where she was raised in a family of commercial fishermen. Matika received her teaching certification and worked in primary education at The Tulalip Heritage High School  for 5 years. There, she experienced firsthand the lack of educational resources to teach indigenous intelligence and dismayed that the curriculum being taught did not provide Native youths with positive imagery and understanding. Thus began the momentum behind Project 562.

Life
Wilbur was born on April 28, 1984. She grew up in La Conner, Washington and graduated from La Conner High School. She received her bachelor's degree from the Brooks Institute of Photography in 2006. After receiving her degree from the Brooks Institute of Photography , Wilbur began her career within the fashion industry and commercial work. Wilbur realized that these industries did not spark her interest and decided to choose a different route as a photographer. She devoted herself to the Native American community. It was through her photography that she would be a messenger and voice for Native individuals.

Art career
Wilbur's three initial photographic projects include We Are One People, a photograph collection of Coast Salish elders; We Emerge, a photograph collection of Native people in contemporary settings, and Save the Indian and Kill the Man, a collection of Native youth expressing their identities. Her other work includes "", presenting images interwoven with cedar bark.

“All Alone” is a 2012 project that addresses the cultural assimilation of Native Americans between the 1880-1980.

“iHuman” is a 2013 cultural project that represents the cultural dualism that Native Americans live upon.

The artist specializes in hand-tinted, black-and-white silver gelatin prints. She plans on publishing a book about her photography.

Project 562 
Project 562 is Wilbur's fourth major project to document contemporary Indigenous peoples. She began traveling throughout the US in November 2012 with the goal of photographing members all US tribes on their tribal lands.
She has traveled 250,000 miles documenting indigenous people.  She raised over $35,000 for her expenses in a Kickstarter campaign. The title Project 562 refers to the number of Indigenous North American tribes officially recognized by the United States at the time Wilbur began the work. That number has since changed, reflecting the ongoing legal efforts of individual tribes to regain legal status after the decimation of tribal status under the United States Termination policy. Wilbur notes that her grandmother came to her in a dream suggesting she do this work of photographing a member from every federally recognized tribe. She works collaboratively with tribal leaders and members to create the photographs. Wilbur conceives of Project 562 as an answer to Edward Curtis' photographs, a century earlier, of Indigenous Americans. Curtis took over 40,000 photographs of 80 tribes seeking faces that conveyed witness to devastation of lands, ecosystems, and culture.  Project 562 shows the vibrancy of Indigenous Americans through the lens an Indigenous American photographer.

Wilbur started “Project 562” as a photographic series in 2012. In order to create this project, Wilbur sold everything and began traveling throughout all 50 states. She utilized various forms of travel such as an RV, horse, plane, boat, and foot. Throughout her journey, Wilbur encountered many tribal communities. She has also been welcomed into many and found support within these communities. In this journey she has come across over 300 sovereign states. She is aiming for a change within this evaporating race through conversations, photographs, audio and video recordings. “Project 562” continues to address tribal sovereignty, construct cultural bridges, and honors a legacy in regards to this country.

Podcast 
Wilbur also hosts the podcast "All My Relations" with Adrienne Keene. The podcast's purpose is "to explore our relationships— relationships to land, to our creatural relatives, and to one another. Each episode invites guests to delve into a different topic facing Native peoples today as we keep it real, play games, laugh a lot, and even cry sometimes."

Selected exhibitions
 2014: Photographic Presence and Contemporary Indians: Matika Wilbur’s Project 562, Tacoma Art Museum, Washington
 2014–2016: As We See It: Contemporary Native American Photographers, Yekaterinburg Museum of Fine Arts, Ekaterinburg, Russia; The Fifth Biennial of Contemporary Photography; Novosibirsk State Art Museum, Novosibirsk, Russia; 516 ARTS, Albuquerque, NM
 2016: Seed of Culture: The Portraits and Stories of Native American Women, Radcliffe Institute at Harvard University
March 13 - June 13, 2021: Whatcom Museum: Seeds of Culture, Bellingham, WA
October, 2018 - January, 2018: El Segundo Museum of Art Matriarchs Exhibition, El Segundo, CA
November, 2018 - December, 2018: Anne Kittrell Art Gallery, Project 562, Campus Collection Series, Fayetteville, AR

Notes

External links
 Matika Wilbur, official site
 Matika Wilbur: "Changing the Way We See Native Americans", TEDx Talk
 "What Native Americans really look like, CNN article about Matika Wilbur

1984 births
21st-century Native Americans
21st-century Native American women
American podcasters
American women photographers
Coast Salish people
Duwamish tribe
Living people
Native American photographers
Native American women artists
People from La Conner, Washington
American women podcasters